Agyneta mendosa is a species of sheet weaver found in Colombia. It was described by Millidge in 1991.

References

mendosa
Arthropods of Colombia
Endemic fauna of Colombia
Spiders of South America
Spiders described in 1991